The McAllen Independent School District is a school district headquartered in the city of McAllen, Texas, United States.

In 2009, the school district was rated "academically acceptable" by the Texas Education Agency.

Schools 

The campuses of the MISD include 5 High Schools, 6 Middle Schools, and 21 Elementary Schools. High Schools Achieve Early College and Lamar Academy are ranked among the best schools in the nation with Lamar being a top 10 ranked High School.

High schools
 Achieve Early College High School
 McAllen High School
 McAllen Memorial High School
 Lamar Academy
 James "Nikki" Rowe High School

Middle schools
 Brown Middle School
 Cathey Middle School
 De Leon Middle School
 Fossum Middle School
 Morris Middle School
 Travis Middle School

Elementary schools
 Alvarez Elementary School
 Bonham Elementary School
 Castañeda Elementary School
 Escandon Elementary School
 Fields Elementary School
 Garza Elementary School
 Gonzalez Elementary School
 Hendricks Elementary
 Houston Elementary School
 Jackson Elementary School
 McAuliffe Elementary School
 Milam Elementary School
 Perez Elementary
 Rayburn Elementary School
 Roosevelt Elementary School
 Sanchez Elementary
 Seguin Elementary School
 Sanchez Elementary School
 Thigpen-Zavala Elementary School
 Wilson Elementary School

See also

List of school districts in Texas

References

External links 
 

School districts in Hidalgo County, Texas
 01
Education in McAllen, Texas